Gilgamesh: A New English Version is a book about Gilgamesh by Stephen Mitchell. It was published in New York by The Free Press in 2004, and is held in over 2700 WorldCat libraries. It was reviewed by Jasper Grifrin in  The New York Review of Books 53, no. 4, (2006): 25, by The Gay & Lesbian Review Worldwide; 12, no. 2, (2005): 38–39, and the Hudson Review, Summer, 2005, vol. 58, no. 2, p. 329-334.

References

External links
 

2004 books
Works based on the Epic of Gilgamesh